
Year 275 BC was a year of the pre-Julian Roman calendar. At the time it was known as the Year of the Consulship of Dentatus and Caudinus (or, less frequently, year 479 Ab urbe condita). The denomination 275 BC for this year has been used since the early medieval period, when the Anno Domini calendar era became the prevalent method in Europe for naming years.

Events 
 By place 

 Egypt 
 The Museum of Alexandria is founded by the Egyptian King Ptolemy II.

 Roman Republic 
 When Pyrrhus returns from Sicily, he finds himself vastly outnumbered by a superior Roman army under the command of consul Manius Curius Dentatus. After the inconclusive Battle of Beneventum, Roman commander and statesman, Gaius Fabricius Luscinus, negotiates a peace with Pyrrhus, after which Pyrrhus decides to end his campaign in Italy and return to Epirus, which results in the loss of all his Italian holdings.

 Sicily 
 Following the departure of Pyrrhus from Sicily, the Syracusan army and the city's citizens appoint Hiero II as the commander of their slaves. He strengthens his position by marrying the daughter of Leptines, the city's leading citizen.

 Greece 
 Antiochus's alliance with Antigonus II, now fully in possession of Macedonia, is cemented by Antigonus's marriage to Phila, Antiochus's half sister.

China
 General Bai Qi of the State of Qin brings order to the rebellious provinces of Wu and Qianzhong, which had been formed from the territories conquered from the State of Chu between 280 and 278 BC.
 General Lian Po of the State of Zhou invades the State of Wei and captures the cities of Fangling and Anyang.

Births 
 Hamilcar Barca, Carthaginian general, statesman and father of Hannibal (approximate date)
 Quintus Fabius Maximus Verrucosus, Roman dictator, politician and leader (approximate date)

Deaths 
 Shen Dao, Chinese philosopher from Zhao who also served at the Jixia academy in Qi. He is known for his blend of Legalism and Taoism (approximate date)

References